Overland is a strategy video game by Finji. It was released in September 2019 for iOS, Linux, macOS, Nintendo Switch, PlayStation 4, Windows, and Xbox One, and in December 2022 for PlayStation 5.

Gameplay 

The player navigates a survivor, a dog, and their car, through turn-based tactical scenarios in a post-apocalyptic world.

The objective of the game is to reach California on an across the country road trip. There are currently 7 biomes: the East Coast, the Woodlands, the Grasslands, the Mountains, the Desert, the Basin, and the Reef.

Development 

Inspirations for the game include X-COM, The Banner Saga, and Dead of Winter: A Cross Roads Game.

Overland was released on September 19, 2019, for Nintendo Switch, PlayStation 4, Windows, and Xbox One platforms. Early version of the game were available through Itch.io. The developer also plans an iOS release.

Reception

Accolades 
The game was nominated for the Matthew Crump Cultural Innovation Award at the SXSW Gaming Awards.

References

Further reading

External links 

 

2019 video games
Indie video games
Finji games
Turn-based strategy video games
Apple Arcade games
Linux games
Nintendo Switch games
PlayStation 4 games
Post-apocalyptic video games
Video games developed in the United States
Windows games
Xbox One games
Single-player video games